Karel Matěj Čapek-Chod (21 February 1860 in Domažlice – 3 November 1927 in Prague) was a Czech naturalistic writer and a journalist.

Biography 
In 1879 he graduated at the gymnasium in Domažlice. He was a long-term cooperator of the Národní listy journal, and after Karel Čapek began to work in the editorial office (in 1918), Čapek accepted the nickname "Chod".

Work 
 Povidky, 1892   
 V třetím dvoře, novel 1895   
 Nedělni povídky, 1897   
 Osmero, novel : 1900-1903  
 Patero novel 1900-1903 
 Kašpar Lén mstitel, novel,  1908  
 Z města i obvodu, Novels, 1913  
 Antonín Vondrejc. novel, 1915  
 Turbína, novel, 1916  
 Ad hoc! novelle, 1919  
 Nejzapadnejsi Slovan (The westernmost Slav), 1921   
 Jindrové, novel, 1921  
 Větrník : autoanalytic-synthetic novel, 1923 
 Vilém Rozkoč, novel, 1923 
 Humoreska, 1924 
 Labyrint světa, 1926 
 Řešany, novel, 1927 
 An der Rotationsmaschine, novelle, 1928 
 Spisy, 1938–41

See also 
 List of Czech writers

References

External links

1860 births
1927 deaths
People from Domažlice
Czech male writers